Fengqi You is a professor and holds the Roxanne E. and Michael J. Zak Chair at Cornell University in the United States. His research focuses on systems engineering and data science. According to Google Scholar, his h-index is 72.

Career 
Fengqi You completed his undergraduate studies at Tsinghua University, and received his Ph.D. in 2009 from Carnegie Mellon University. After working at Argonne National Laboratory and Northwestern University, he moved to Cornell University, where he holds positions in Systems Engineering, Electrical and Computer Engineering, Chemical and Biomolecular Engineering, Applied Mathematics, Operations Research and Information Engineering, Applied Information Systems, Civil and Environmental Engineering, and Mechanical Engineering. He is Cornell Energy Institute's associate director, associate director of Cornell Institute of Digital Agriculture, and Chair of Ph.D. Studies in Cornell Systems Engineering. He co-directs Cornell University AI for Science Institute and co-leads the Schmidt AI in Science initiative at Cornell with Carla Gomes.

You is an associate editor of Science Advances, an associate editor of IEEE Transactions on Control Systems Technology, and editor of Computers & Chemical Engineering. He is a member of the editorial boards of ACS Sustainable Chemistry & Engineering,  AIChE Journal, and Industrial & Engineering Chemistry Research.

Teaching and research
Fengqi You teaches courses on computational optimization, machine learning, deep learning, quantum computing and artificial intelligence, and process design. There are news media reports about his research on quantum artificial intelligence, renewable energy transition, smart energy systems, solar energy materials, electric vehicle batteries, water management, climate impacts of hybrid conferences, carbon neutrality, microplastics, plastics and medical waste recycling, carbon footprint accounting, crypto, and AI in Science.

Awards 
 2010 — Carnegie Mellon University Ken Meyer Award
 2013 — Northwestern-Argonne Early Career Investigator Award
 2016 — NSF Career Award
 2017 — American Institute of Chemical Engineers Environmental Division Award
 2017 — Sustainable Engineering Research Award
 2018 — Cornell Research Excellence Award
 2018 — ACS Sustainable Chemistry & Engineering Lectureship Award
 2019 — Excellence in Process Development Research Award by AIChE
 2020 — Program Committee's Award for Innovations in Green Process Engineering
 2020 — Curtis W. McGraw Research Award from American Society for Engineering Education
 2020 — American Automatic Control Council O. Hugo Schuck Award
2021 — Fellow of the Royal Society of Chemistry (FRSC)
2022 — Stratis V. Sotirchos Lectureship Award, Foundation for Research & Technology – Hellas
2022 — Fellow of the American Institute of Chemical Engineers (AIChE Fellow)
2023 — Fellow of AAAS

References

External links 

 Research group website
 Fengqi You's publications indexed by Google Scholar
 Cornell University Online Open Textbook on Computational Optimization
 Northwestern University Chemical Process Design Open Textbook
 Northwestern University Open Text Book on Process Optimization
 COVID-19 Cases in New York State

1983 births
Living people
Chemical engineering academics
21st-century American engineers
American chemical engineers
Cornell University faculty
20th-century American engineers
Northwestern University faculty
Tsinghua University alumni
Carnegie Mellon University alumni
Systems engineers
American people of Chinese descent
American computer scientists
Academic journal editors
Engineers from Fujian
People from Quanzhou